Lawsuits related to the 2020 United States presidential election refers to either:

 Pre-election lawsuits related to the 2020 United States presidential election, filed before Election Day
 Post-election lawsuits related to the 2020 United States presidential election, filed during or after Election Day